Paul Sullivan (born July 31, 1955) is an American Grammy Award winning pianist and composer whose music blends jazz and classical styles. He is a member of the Paul Winter Consort.

Early life, education and early career
Sullivan was born and grew up in Boston, Massachusetts. He attended St. Paul's Choir School from its founding in 1963 until 1969. He graduated from Phillips Exeter Academy in 1973 and Yale University in 1977. Sullivan began playing jazz in New Haven, and moved to New York City in 1978 where he performed at Bradley's and other major jazz clubs. He had a variety of freelance jobs including playing for and conducting Broadway shows.

Starting a record company
In 1988 Sullivan moved to Brooklin, Maine to write music. He and his wife, Jillson Knowles, founded the record company River Music.

Sullivan is co-creator of the performance piece A Terrible Beauty, which is based on The Law of Dreams by Peter Behrens. The piece was performed in Maine and off-Broadway in New York City in 2010.

His jazz ballad "Whisper" was a finalist in the 2009 International Songwriting Competition. The song was recorded by Theresa Thomason, with whom he regularly performs, and appears on his album Break Away with his jazz ensemble PS Jazz.

In the 1990s his record label published books on tape, which included White on White, a selection of E.B. White essays read by Joel White.

Sullivan's first major choral work, River, premiered in 2010 by the Bagaduce Chorale of Blue Hill, Maine. He has composed for the Pilobolus Dance Theater.

Writing
Sullivan is also known for his writing. In the spring of 1994 he attended the International Cello Festival in Manchester England with Eugene Friesen. Sullivan's story about this event called "The Cellist of Sarajevo" was published in Hope Magazine, Reader's Digest, The Book of Hope, Life Touched With Wonder: Windows of Hope and numerous blogs.

Awards
Sullivan received a Grammy Award as a member of the Paul Winter Consort for the 2006 album Silver Solstice. He received two NAIRD Indie Awards. In 1992 he won in the category of Seasonal Music for Christmas in Maine, and in 1997 he won in the category of Spoken Word for White on White.

Discography 
 1987: Sketches of Maine
 1988: A Visit to the Rockies
 1990: Folk Art
 1991: Nights in the Gardens of Maine
 1992: Christmas in Maine
 1993: A Paul Sullivan Collection
 1993: Wild Fox - book on tape
 1995: Half Truths and Whole Lies - book on tape
 1996: Circle 'Round the Seasons
 1996: White on White - book on tape
 1996: 50s Slow Dance
 1997: More 50s Slow Dances
 1998: 60s Sweet and Bittersweet
 1998: Young at Heart
 1999: Slow Sweet Swing
 2002: Songs Without Words
 2003: Yuletide
 2005: Silver Solstice - Grammy Award winner
 2007: Christmas in Maine - guest appearance
 2007: My Irish Soul
 2008: Break Away
 2010: Amazing Music of Maine - guest appearance
 2010: Painters, Poets and Players - guest appearance
 2011: Christmas Pure and Simple - with Rosie Upton
 2011: Paul & Theresa: Favorite Duos, Vol. 1 - with Theresa Thomason

References

External links 
River Music

American male composers
20th-century American composers
New-age pianists
Chamber jazz pianists
Windham Hill Records artists
Grammy Award winners
Smooth jazz pianists
1955 births
Living people
Musicians from Boston
Phillips Exeter Academy alumni
Yale University alumni
American male writers
People from Brooklin, Maine
20th-century American pianists
American male pianists
21st-century American pianists
20th-century American male musicians
21st-century American male musicians
American male jazz musicians
Paul Winter Consort members